Poznanovec is a village in the municipality Bedekovčina in Croatia. It is connected by the D24 highway and R201 railway.

References

Populated places in Krapina-Zagorje County